The Blaydes House, in Shelby County, Kentucky near Bagdad, Kentucky, was built in 1833.  It was listed on the National Register of Historic Places in 1988.

It is a Federal-style brick building, with brick laid in Flemish bond.  It was deemed significant "as a good example of the early 19th century (1810-40) 1-story, brick center-passage, single-pile plan in Shelby County. It is one of 17 identified from the period, and one of 3 with a projecting central pavillion."  It was built in 1833 and remodelled in 1884.

References

National Register of Historic Places in Shelby County, Kentucky
Federal architecture in Kentucky
Houses completed in 1833
Houses in Shelby County, Kentucky
1833 establishments in Kentucky
Central-passage houses